Kaplino is a rural locality (a selo) in Starooskolsky District, Belgorod Oblast, Russia. The population was 1,229 as of 2010. There are 43 streets.

Geography 
Kaplino is located 11 km north of Stary Oskol (the district's administrative centre) by road. Fedoseyevka is the nearest rural locality.

References 

Rural localities in Starooskolsky District